Sondra Dee Radvanovsky (born 11 April 1969) is an American-Canadian soprano. Specializing in 19th-century Italian opera. Radvanovsky is widely regarded as one of the best sopranos in her generation - the premiere Verdi soprano alive today, as well as the leading interpreter of Bel Canto, Verismo, and many others. She has a remarkably extensive repertoire and has portrayed some of the most demanding opera heroines stamped by her own, including the title role in Medea, Norma, Tosca, Rusalka, and Leonora in Il Trovatore, Lady Macbeth in Macbeth, and also the Donizetti's "Tudor Queens" - the title role in Anna Bolena, Maria Stuarda, and Elizabeth I in Roberto Devereux.

Early life and studies
Radvanovsky was born in Berwyn, Illinois, to a Czech father and Danish mother. At age 11, she moved to Richmond, Indiana. She studied at Richmond High School and then Mission Viejo High School. She sang her first full-length opera, La bohème as Mimì in Richmond at the age of 21. She studied voice at the University of Southern California for 2 years and drama at the University of California, Los Angeles for 2 years, after which she studied privately. She also received training at the Tanglewood Music Center and the University of Cincinnati – College-Conservatory of Music.

In 1995 Radvanovsky won the Metropolitan Opera National Council Auditions and first prize in the Loren L. Zachary Society Competition. In 1997 she won the George London Foundation Competition. Her teachers have included Martial Singher, Ruth Falcon, and Anthony Manoli, who is also her accompanist.

Career

After the National Council Auditions, Radvanovsky enrolled in the Metropolitan Opera's Lindemann Young Artist Development Program. In 1996, she appeared in Rigoletto as Countess Ceprano. After performances in smaller roles there, she came to attention as Antonia in Les contes d'Hoffmann.
She became a regular soloist at the Met, performing in Stiffelio, Carmen, Il trovatore, La bohème, and La traviata.
In May 1999, she appeared at Houston Grand Opera as Elena in Mefistofele. In 2000, she performed in Luisa Miller at the Spoleto Festival USA.
In October 2002, she appeared at the Lyric Opera of Chicago in the title role in Susannah.

In 2006, she made her Royal Opera debut in Alfano's Cyrano de Bergerac, opposite Plácido Domingo in the title role.

In 2010, she opened the Canadian Opera Company's season in the title role of Verdi's Aida. She has had success in recent years as Leonora, notably in David McVicar's production of Il trovatore at the Metropolitan Opera. In 2011, she hosted the Metropolitan Opera Live in HD, which was broadcast in movie theaters around the world. In addition to her specialty in Verdi heroines, she has also sung the title roles in Suor Angelica, Tosca, Susannah, Rusalka, and Norma, among others.

During the 2014/15 season, Radvanovsky sang the title role in Norma, which she called a "perfect role vocally and temperamentally" in an interview with The New York Times, at the San Francisco Opera. She made her Norma debut at the Teatro Campoamor with Ópera de Oviedo in the 2011/12 season and received critical and popular acclaim in the role during the 2013/14 season at the Metropolitan Opera.

In the Metropolitan Opera's 2015/16 season, Radvanovsky performed all three queens in Donizetti's "Tudor" operas, Anna Bolena, Maria Stuarda, and Queen Elizabeth I in Roberto Devereux.

At the Paris Opera in 2016 Radvanovsky sang the title role of Aida and won praise for her "superlative technique". Other roles at the Paris Opera have included Marguerite in Faust, Hélène in Les vêpres siciliennes and Élisabeth in  Don Carlos.
She opened the Metropolitan Opera's 2017/18 season, as Norma in a new production.

At the Liceu Opera, Barcelona, on 24 March 2018, after receiving a prolonged ovation for her performance of the aria La mamma morta in the opera Andrea Chénier, she and the conductor gave an encore, a practice which is now rare. On 4 July 2018, she repeated the aria D'amor sull'ali rosee during a performance of Il trovatore at the Opéra Bastille in Paris, the first woman - and only the third singer - to ever do so since the house's opening in 1989.    

Radvanovsky opened the 2022/23 season at the Metropolitan Opera with a new production of Cherubini's Medea, the first performance of this opera in the company's history. The performances received rave reviews from all major critics.   

In concert, Radvanovsky has performed Beethoven's Ninth with James Levine and the Boston Symphony Orchestra, Rossini's Stabat Mater with the Orchestra of the Age of Enlightenment, and the Verdi Requiem with David Zinman and the Chicago Symphony Orchestra and the Vienna Symphony, and with Sir Gilbert Levine and the Pittsburgh Symphony Orchestra.

Plácido Domingo has been a noted champion of her career.

Personal life
Radvanovsky was introduced to Duncan Lear by tenor Michael Schade. They married in December 2001 and Lear assumed the role as her business manager. She lived in New York while her husband was in Toronto during the first year of marriage, after which they lived together in the suburbs of Greater Toronto, first in Oakville, and then in Caledon, Ontario. She acquired Canadian citizenship in February 2016. In 2022 Radvanovsky announced her divorce from Lear.

Awards and recognition
Radvanovsky won Outstanding Female Performances in Roberto Devereux with the Canadian Opera Company in 2014 Dora Award, while the production itself was awarded the best production. She also won the Female Singer category in the 2nd Annual Excellence in Opera Awards for the same production.
She was a recipient of 2015 Opera News Award. On 12 October 2016 she was honored in the annual Opera Canada Awards. She won "Sustained Excellence in Performance" in the 4th Annual Excellence in Opera Awards for the Tudor trilogy at the Met.
She won "Outstanding Female Performance" in the 2017 Dora Award for Norma with Canadian Opera Company. She was named the 2018 Vocalist of the Year by magazine Musical America. In June 2018 she was named an Honorary Fellow of the Royal Conservatory of Music.

Discography

CD
 Verdi Arias; Constantine Orbelian conducting Russian Philharmonic Orchestra (Delos, 2010)
 Verdi Opera Scenes with Dmitri Hvorostovsky; Constantine Orbelian conducting Russian Philharmonic Orchestra (Delos, 2011)
 Donizetti The Three Queens - Lyric Opera of Chicago, Riccardo Frizza (conductor) (Pentatone, 2022)
 Turandot with Jonas Kaufmann, Ermonela Jaho; Antonio Pappano conducting Orchestra dell' Accademia Nazionale di Santa Cecilia (Warner Classics, 2023)

DVD
 Alfano's Cyrano de Bergerac with Plácido Domingo, Naxos 2009
 Leonora in Il trovatore, The Metropolitan Opera, 2011
 Amelia in Un ballo in maschera, The Metropolitan Opera, 2013
 Norma in Norma, The Gran Teatre del Liceu, 2015
 Norma in Norma, The Metropolitan Opera, 2018

References

External links
 
 Centre Stage Management
 IMG Artists page archived on 27 May 2011
 Classical Archives Interview
 : "Vissi d'arte", Metropolitan Opera, 2011

1969 births
Living people
American operatic sopranos
People from Berwyn, Illinois
Singers from Illinois
Classical musicians from Illinois
Musicians from Richmond, Indiana
Singers from Indiana
Naturalized citizens of Canada
American emigrants to Canada
American people of Czech descent
American people of Danish descent
Winners of the Metropolitan Opera National Council Auditions
Dora Mavor Moore Award winners
Fellows of the Royal Conservatory of Music
20th-century American women  opera singers
21st-century American women opera singers